The 2021 Uruguay Open was a professional tennis tournament played on red clay courts in Montevideo. It was the 16th edition of the tournament for the men which was part of the 2021 ATP Challenger Tour. It took place at the Carrasco Lawn Tennis Club in Montevideo, Uruguay between November 8 and 14, 2021. The 2020 edition could not take place due to the COVID-19 pandemic.

Singles main-draw entrants

Seeds

 1 Rankings are as of 1 November 2021.

Other entrants
The following players received wildcards into the singles main draw:
  Martín Cuevas
  Francisco Llanes
  Franco Roncadelli

The following players received entry into the singles main draw as alternates:
  Hernán Casanova
  Genaro Alberto Olivieri
  Santiago Rodríguez Taverna

The following players received entry from the qualifying draw:
  Francisco Comesaña
  Luciano Darderi
  Facundo Juárez
  Gonzalo Villanueva

Champions

Singles

  Hugo Dellien def.  Juan Ignacio Londero 6–0, 6–1.

Doubles

  Rafael Matos /  Felipe Meligeni Alves def.  Ignacio Carou /  Luciano Darderi 6–4, 6–4.

External links
 Official website

References

2021 ATP Challenger Tour
2021
Uruguay Open